The 2014–15 season was the 88th season in ACF Fiorentina's history and their 77th season in Serie A. The club competed in Serie A, finishing fourth, and reached the semi-finals in both the Coppa Italia and UEFA Europa League; in the latter competition they were eliminated 5–0 on aggregate by eventual champions Sevilla.

The season was coach Vincenzo Montella's third and final season with the club – as well as third consecutive fourth-placed finish – as he would be sacked and replaced by former Juventus player Paulo Sousa in the 2015–16 pre-season. Slovenian player Josip Iličić finished as top scorer in the league with eight goals, while Iličić and German international and former Bayern Munich player Mario Gómez together finished as top scorers in all competitions, with ten goals each.

Season review
The 2014–15 season saw Fiorentina compete on three fronts as they did the previous season, with one improvement being that they qualified automatically to the group stage of the Europa League (rather than having to traverse a qualifying round) due to the fact that the previous season's Coppa Italia winners Napoli qualified to the Champions League.

Players

Squad information
Last updated on 31 May 2015
Appearances include league matches only

Transfers

In

Out

Pre-season and friendlies

Competitions

Overall

Serie A

League table

Results summary

Results by round

Matches

Coppa Italia

UEFA Europa League

Group stage

Knockout phase

Round of 32

Round of 16

Quarter-finals

Semi-finals

Statistics

Appearances and goals

|-
! colspan=12 style="background:#9400D3; color:#FFFFFF; text-align:center"| Goalkeepers

|-
! colspan=12 style="background:#9400D3; color:#FFFFFF; text-align:center"| Defenders

|-
! colspan=12 style="background:#9400D3; color:#FFFFFF; text-align:center"| Midfielders

|-
! colspan=12 style="background:#9400D3; color:#FFFFFF; text-align:center"| Forwards

|-
! colspan=12 style="background:#9400D3; color:#FFFFFF; text-align:center"| Players transferred out during the season

Goalscorers

Last updated: 31 May 2015

Clean sheets

Last updated: 31 May 2015

Disciplinary record

Last updated: 31 May 2015

References

ACF Fiorentina seasons
Fiorentina
Fiorentina